Mike Reid (born 15 August 1982), is a British chef known as a co-host of two Australian cooking television series, My Market Kitchen and TEN’s Ten Minute Kitchen.

In March 2020, Reid starred alongside other notable chefs at the popular BBC cooking show, Ready Steady Cook".

 Career 
After graduating from the University of Portsmouth, Reid moved to London, where  he began his career as a chef. He worked as an apprenticeship at The In & Out club  in St James and later worked  in the kitchens of the Royal Air Force Club. He worked in Le Gavroche and Restaurant Gordon Ramsay under the tutelage of  notable chefs such as Michel Roux Jr, Simone Zanoni and Mr. Ramsay.

In 2007, Reid joined the team at Gaucho restaurants and later became the  Head Chef there. He managed  both the Richmond and O2 sites before he was promoted to the topmost position for the entire Gaucho Group.

In 2013, Reid left London  and moved to  Melbourne where he worked in Attica alongside the celebrity chef Ben Shewry. He also worked in Andrew McConnell’s 2 Hat restaurant Cutler and Co. In 2014, Reid  worked with celebrity  chef Shannon Bennett and his Vue de Monde Group to open Jardin Tan. In  2014, he returned to the United Kingdom and opened a restaurant in London tagged M. In  2015,  he opened the second M restaurant  in Victoria Street.

Reid wrote his first cookbook titled M a 24 Hour Cookbook  which was published  in 2016 by Bloomsbury Publishers. In 2016, he started appearing  on Channel 4's  Sunday Brunch  live TV show  as guest chef. He also  appeared on the BBC Great British Menu representing the London and South East region against the countries best chefs. He featured  on Master chef on BBC One and Tricks of the Restaurant Trade on C4.

In 2017, Reid  opened the third M restaurant  in Twickenham. In 2019, he started  overseeing the  newly formed Rare Restaurants which encompasses both Gaucho and M Restaurants.

Reid features  as a guest alongside James Martin on Saturday’s Kitchen in the UK, 
and Justine Schofield on Everyday Gourmet,  and Diana Chan on Asia Unplated'' in Australia.

See also 
 Ready Steady Cook
 My Market Kitchen

References

External links
 M Restaurant website

Living people
Australian television chefs
English television chefs
Alumni of the University of Portsmouth
Australian television talk show hosts
British television talk show hosts
1982 births